Puerto Rico Highway 181 (PR-181), also known as Expreso Trujillo Alto, is a road that connects the towns of San Juan, Puerto Rico (very close to Carolina) in the north/northeast coast of Puerto Rico with Patillas in the southeast, passing through the municipalities of San Juan (very small part) at Jesus de Piñero Avenue (PR-17) as it approaches the Teodoro Moscoso Bridge and the Luis Muñoz Marín International Airport, Trujillo Alto, Gurabo, San Lorenzo, Yabucoa and Patillas in the center of the town district near PR-3. Along with PR-10, PR-149, PR-1 and PR-52, it is one of the longest highways crossing the island from north to south through the central mountainous region.  In the north part of Trujillo Alto it is a four-lane highway, turning completely rural on the way to Patillas with the exception of a small tract in Gurabo where it intersects PR-30.

Route description

Rural road
In Trujillo Alto, near Gurabo, it turns into a rural road with very narrow lanes per direction and hard curves, making it dangerous and requiring low speed limits. In Gurabo, it becomes divided in about 1 kilometer as it intersects Puerto Rico Highway 30, and then quickly turns rural. In San Lorenzo its makes intersection with Puerto Rico Highway 183. For the rest of its length it is still rural. In Yabucoa, PR-182 begins to connect to the main town, while PR-181 continues and as it enters Patillas, it borders lake Carite, before arriving to downtown Patillas, where it meets PR-3.

Major intersections

See also

 List of highways numbered 181

References

External links
 

181